Mohamed Soumaïla (born 30 October 1994) is a Nigerien professional footballer who plays as a full-back for Régional 3 club Bulgnéville Contrex Vittel and the Niger national team. He was part of the Niger squads that played at the 2012 and 2013 Africa Cup of Nations.

Honours 
Olympic Niamey

 Niger Premier League: 2011–12

References

1994 births
Living people
People from Niamey
Nigerien footballers
Niger international footballers
Association football fullbacks
2012 Africa Cup of Nations players
2013 Africa Cup of Nations players
Olympic FC de Niamey players
CS Sfaxien players
Olympique Noisy-le-Sec players
US Raon-l'Étape players
Nigerien expatriate footballers
Expatriate footballers in Tunisia
Expatriate footballers in France
Nigerien expatriate sportspeople in France